Carl Weber (born 1964) is an American author and publisher.

He owns Urban Books, a publishing company, and formerly owned Urban Knowledge, a chain of bookstores.

Weber is from Jamaica, Queens, New York. He attended Virginia State University, where he received a B.S., and the University of Virginia, where he received an MBA.

He published his first book, Lookin' for Luv, in 2000. Man on the Run was a Library Journal pick of the month; So You Call Yourself a Man was a Library Journal bestseller.

His The Family Business series was made into a television series on BET. The first season aired in 2018. A second season set to air in 2020 was announced in 2019. Weber's novel Influence was adapted for BET Plus.

Selected works 

Lookin' for Luv. Dafina, 2000. 
Married Men. Dafina, 2001.
Baby Momma Drama. Kensington/Dafina, 2003 
Player Haters. Kensington/Dafina, 2004.
 The Preacher's Son. Kensington/Dafina, 2005.
So You Call Yourself a Man. Kensington/Dafina, 2006.
She Ain't the One. Dafina, 2006.
Something on the Side. Kensington/Dafina, 2008.
Up to No Good. Kensington/Dafina, 2009.
 Big Girls Do Cry. Dafina Books, 2010.
Town between Two Lovers. Kensington/Dafina, 2010.
Choir Director. Kensington/Dafina, 2011.
The Man in 3B. Grand Central, 2013.
 Man on the Run. Grand Central Publishing, 2017.
Influence. Urban Books, 2018.

The Family Business series 

 The Family Business. With Eric Pete. Urban Books, 2012. 
The Family Business 2. With Treasure Hernandez. Urban Books, 2013. 
 The Family Business 3: The Return of Vegas. With Treasure Hernandez. Urban Books, 2014. 
The Family Business 4. With C.N. Phillips. Urban Books, 2018.

References

External links 

Interview with Access Cleveland

1964 births
Living people
African-American writers
American book publishers (people)
21st-century African-American people
20th-century African-American people